HOTEL DE GmbH is a company headquartered in Nuremberg, Bayern, Germany, which runs Internet platforms for booking hotels. It was founded in 2001 and was listed in the General Standard from 2006 to 2011 and in the Entry Standard during 2012/2013 on the Frankfurt Stock Exchange. In 2013, hotel.de was delisted after a squeeze out by HRS, which has held a majority since 2011. Together, the former competitors have a roughly two-thirds share of the market.

Products
The company first offered services exclusively for the German-language market under the domain hotel.de. In 2006, the company began expanding abroad, and the international offerings in the UK, France, Spain and Italy were grouped under hotel.info two years later. hotel.de AG receives a commission for reservations made via the site. There are also apps for iOS and Android smartphones.

Awards
In 2006, hotel.de won the German Founder's prize of initiative StartUp in the category newcomer, in the following year the prize "Bavaria's best 50" of the Bavarian State Ministry for economics for "special strength of growth". Since 2009 hotel.de was multiple elected as "website of the year" in the category leisure and travel. In 2011 the business magazine "Der Handel" awarded the iPhone app of hotel.de with the "e-Star Online Excellence Award", in 2012 the Android app with the "MobileTech Award".

External links
 Official website German market
 Official website international market

References

Hospitality companies established in 2001
Companies based in Nuremberg
Companies formerly listed on the Frankfurt Stock Exchange
German travel websites